İzdemir power station is a 350-megawatt coal-fired power station in Turkey in İzmir Province, which burns imported coal.

References

External links 

 İzdemir power station on Global Energy Monitor

Coal-fired power stations in Turkey
Aliağa District
Economy of İzmir Province
2014 establishments in Turkey
Buildings and structures in İzmir Province